Luge was inducted at the Youth Olympic Games at the inaugural edition in 2012.

A total of four events were held at the first two editions: boys' and girls' singles, a boys' doubles and a mixed relay event. For 2020, a women's doubles event has been added.

Medalists summary

Boys' singles

Girls' singles

Boys' doubles

Girls' doubles

Mixed relay

Medal table
As of the 2016 Winter Youth Olympics.

See also
Luge at the Winter Olympics

References

 
Youth Olympics
Sports at the Winter Youth Olympics